Kelantan Football Association is a Malaysian professional football team based in Kota Bharu, Kelantan. The team was formed in 1946 as Kelantan Amateur Football Association. They are currently compete in Malaysia Super League.

The most successful person to manage Kelantan FA is Haji Azman Ibrahim, who won 2 Malaysia Super League titles, 2 FA Cups, 2 Malaysia Cups and 1 Charity Shield in his managerial since 2009.

Managerial history
Manager by Years (1991–present)

References

External links
 Managers at theredwarriors.com